Ruess is a surname. Notable people with the surname include:

Everett Ruess (1914 – c.1934?), American artist, poet and writer
Nate Ruess (born 1982), American singer-songwriter

See also
Russ